The Enterococcus-1 RNA motif is a conserved RNA structure that was discovered by bioinformatics.
Enterococcus-1 motif RNAs are found in bacteria of the genus Enterococcus.

Enterococcus-1 RNAs likely function in trans as small RNAs.  Genes nearby to Enterococcus-1 RNAs are often related to phages or plasmids.  Also, all four Enterococcus-1 RNAs that are in completed sequences are located in plasmids.  Predicted Rho-independent transcription terminators are located roughly 70 nucleotides downstream of Enterococcus-1 RNAs.

References

Non-coding RNA